Robert Dornhelm (born 17 December 1947 in Temesvár, Romania) is an Austrian  film and television director.

Biography
Dornhelm is of Jewish descent. He has worked on numerous television programmes and has also released such movies as Echo Park, The Venice Project, Der Unfisch, and A Further Gesture. In 1998 Der Unfisch won the Citizen's Choice Award at the Puchon International Fantastic Film Festival.

He directed the 1977 documentary film The Children of Theatre Street, which was nominated for an Academy Award.

Dornhelm directed the television miniseries Anne Frank: The Whole Story (2001), for which he was nominated for an Emmy Award. He also directed the new TV adaptation Spartacus (2004) and the 2011 film The Amanda Knox Story.

Decorations and awards
 1978: Nominations for Academy Award for Best Documentary for The Children of Theatre Street
 2006: Austrian Cross of Honour for Science and Art

Selected filmography
 The Children of Theatre Street (1977)
 She Dances Alone (1981)
 Echo Park (1986)
 Cold Feet (1989)
  (1991)
 Fatal Deception: Mrs. Lee Harvey Oswald (1993, TV film)
 Der Unfisch (1997)
 A Further Gesture (1997)
 The Venice Project (1999)
 Anne Frank: The Whole Story (2001, TV miniseries)
 Sins of the Father (2002, TV film)
 RFK (2002, TV film)
 Rudy: The Rudy Giuliani Story (2003, TV film)
 Spartacus (2004, TV film) by novel of Howard Fast
 Suburban Madness (2004, TV film)
 Identity Theft: The Michelle Brown Story (2004, TV film)
 The Ten Commandments (2006, TV film)
  (The Crown Prince) (2006, TV film)
 War and Peace (2007, TV miniseries) by novel of Leo Tolstoy
 La Bohème (2008)
 Udo Proksch: Out of Control (2010)
 Amanda Knox: Murder on Trial in Italy (2011, TV film)
  (2011, TV film)
  (2012, TV miniseries)
 Das Sacher (2016, TV film)
 Maria Theresa (2017, miniseries)

References

External links 
 

1947 births
Living people
Austrian film directors
Austrian television directors
Austrian people of Romanian-Jewish descent
Danube-Swabian people
People from Timișoara
Recipients of the Romy (TV award)
Recipients of the Austrian Cross of Honour for Science and Art